The Sharp Willcom D4 is an Ultra mobile PC (UMPC) made and sold only in Japan.
It is capable of running Windows 8 with the touch-friendly Metro-UI. All of the components are supported in Win8. Due to the default partitioning the device will run out of disk space on the system partition if the users installs all recommended Windows Vista and Microsoft Office updates  even if no other software was ever installed. Sharp support advised users to change the partitioning by removing or at least reducing the size of the second visible (data) partition. The recovery partition is recommended to be kept for disaster recovery  although such recovery will result in the original problem  the system partition being too small. The case is rubberized with a chemical process  which originally gave it a nice haptic feel and good grip. However  now that more than a decade has passed the rubberized coat has decayed into a sticky mass which makes it unpleasant to touch the device. The sticky chemical residue can be removed with gasoline and loads of rubbing. Extreme care should be taken with the rubber seals that protect the USB and display ports  since these also dissolve in gasoline.

Features
3.3" x 7.4" x 1.0" size
Full QWERTY keyboard
Bluetooth 2.0 EDR
Wi-Fi
1seg TV tuner
Sliding, folding 5-inch 1024 x 600 LCD touchscreen (Capable of displaying 1024 x 768 with a slightly stretched impression)
MicroSD slot
W-SIM slot and PHS calling system
Stylus

Specifications

CPU: 1.3GHz Intel Atom Z520 processor
RAM: 1 GB
Hard Disk: 40 GB
Graphics: Intel GMA 500 Shared Memory
Operating System: Windows Vista Home Premium
Webcam: Built-in 2-megapixel camera

Ultra Mobile PC